Damn the Torpedoes is the third studio album by Tom Petty and the Heartbreakers, released on October 19, 1979. This was the first of three Petty albums originally released by the Backstreet Records label, distributed by MCA Records. It built on the commercial success and critical acclaim of his two previous albums and reached #2 on the Billboard album chart. The album went on to become certified Triple Platinum by the Recording Industry Association of America (RIAA).

In 2003, the album was ranked number 313 on Rolling Stone magazine's list of the 500 greatest albums of all time, and 231 in a 2020 revised list.

Background and recording
Petty's recording contract was assigned to MCA when his distributor ABC Records was sold to MCA in 1979. Petty contended that his contract could not be assigned to another record company without his permission and was therefore voided. MCA responded by suing Petty for breach of contract which prompted him to declare bankruptcy as a tactic to void his contract with MCA. The matter was settled with Petty signing a new recording contract with Backstreet Records, an MCA subsidiary label. The album, co-produced by Jimmy Iovine, was recorded at Sound City Studios in Van Nuys and Cherokee Studios in Hollywood. The title is a reference to a famous quote by Admiral David Farragut: "Damn the torpedoes, full speed ahead!".

Release and reception

The album was a breakthrough for Petty and the Heartbreakers. It was their first top 10 album, rising to #2 for seven weeks and kept from #1 by Pink Floyd's The Wall on the Billboard albums chart. Tom Petty's response to Westwood One about being anchored at #2 was "I love Pink Floyd but I hated them that year". It yielded two songs that made the top 15 on the Billboard Hot 100 singles chart, "Don't Do Me Like That" (#10) and "Refugee" (#15).  Thanks to the new co-producer Jimmy Iovine, Damn the Torpedoes proved to be a major leap forward in production.

Critical reception generally reflected the commercial success of the album. The original review in Rolling Stone raved that it was the "album we've all been waiting for – that is, if we were all Tom Petty fans, which we would be if there were any justice in the world." Village Voice critic Robert Christgau said, "This is a breakthrough for Petty because for the first time the Heartbreakers ... are rocking as powerfully as he's writing. But whether Petty has any need to rock out beyond the sheer doing of it—whether he has anything to say—remains shrouded in banality. Thus he establishes himself as the perfect rock and roller for those who want good—very good, because Petty really knows his stuff—rock and roll that can be forgotten as soon as the record or the concert is over, rock and roll that won't disturb your sleep, your conscience, or your precious bodily rhythms."

Subsequent appraisals have remained positive, with AllMusic's Stephen Thomas Erlewine regarding it as "one of the great records of the album rock era". Rolling Stone placing it at number 313 on "The 500 Greatest Albums of All Time" list in 2003, the list's 2012 edition had it ranked 315th, and the 2020 edition ranked it at number 231. In 2000 it was voted number 537 in Colin Larkin's All Time Top 1000 Albums.

Re-releases
The album was digitally remastered by Joe Gastwirt and reissued in 2001 on HDCD.

On November 9, 2010, a deluxe edition of the album was released on three formats, a 2×CD set, a 2×LP (180 g) deluxe package and a Blu-ray Audio disc package. Digital download available in numerous audio codecs in audiophile quality 96 kHz/24bit through resellers such as HDTracks.  All the tracks (original and unreleased) were remastered from the original analog master tapes by Chris Bellman at Bernie Grundman Mastering Studios in Hollywood.

Track listing
All tracks written by Tom Petty, except where noted.

Charts

Weekly charts

Year-end charts

Certifications

Personnel
The Heartbreakers
 Tom Petty – lead vocals, rhythm guitar, harmonica, producer
 Mike Campbell – guitars (lead, rhythm, bass), keyboards
 Benmont Tench – keyboards, backing vocals
 Ron Blair – bass guitar
 Stan Lynch – drums, backing vocals

Session musicians
 Donald "Duck" Dunn – bass guitar on "You Tell Me"
 Jim Keltner (uncredited) – percussion on "Refugee"

Recording
 Jimmy Iovine – producer
 Greg Calbi – mastering
 Shelly Yakus – engineer
 John Mathias – assistant engineer
 Thom Panunzio – assistant engineer
 Gray Russell – assistant engineer
 Skip Saylor – assistant engineer
 Tori Swenson – assistant engineer

Artwork
 Lynn Goldsmith – photography
 Dennis Callahan – photography
 Aaron Rapoport – photography
 Glen Christensen – cover photography
 Tommy Steele – art direction

References

Tom Petty albums
Backstreet Records albums
Geffen Records albums
MCA Records albums
Universal Music Enterprises albums
1979 albums
Albums produced by Jimmy Iovine
Albums produced by Tom Petty
Albums recorded at Sound City Studios